This is a list of 1991 British incumbents.

Government
 Monarch
 Head of State – Elizabeth II, Queen of the United Kingdom (1952–2022)
 Prime Minister
 Head of Government – John Major, Prime Minister of the United Kingdom (1990–1997)
First Lord of the Treasury
 John Major, First Lord of the Treasury (1990–1997)
Chancellor of the Exchequer
 Norman Lamont, Chancellor of the Exchequer (1990–1993)
Second Lord of the Treasury
 Norman Lamont, Second Lord of the Treasury (1990–1993)
Secretary of State for Foreign and Commonwealth Affairs
 Douglas Hurd, Secretary of State for Foreign and Commonwealth Affairs (1989–1995)
Secretary of State for the Home Department
 Kenneth Baker, Secretary of State for the Home Department (1990–1992)
Secretary of State for Transport
 Malcolm Rifkind, Secretary of State for Transport (1990–1992)
Secretary of State for Scotland
 Ian Lang, Secretary of State for Scotland (1990–1995)
Secretary of State for Health
 William Waldegrave, Secretary of State for Health (1990–1992)
Secretary of State for Northern Ireland
 Peter Brooke, Secretary of State for Northern Ireland (1989–1992)
Secretary of State for Defence
 Tom King, Secretary of State for Defence (1989–1992)
Secretary of State for Trade and Industry
 Peter Lilley, Secretary of State for Trade and Industry (1990–1992)
Secretary of State for Education
 Kenneth Clarke, Secretary of State for Education and Science (1990–1992)
Secretary of State for Wales
 David Hunt, Secretary of State for Wales (1990–1993)
Lord Privy Seal
 David Waddington, Baron Waddington, Lord Privy Seal (1990–1992)
Leader of the House of Commons
 John MacGregor, Leader of the House of Commons (1990–1992)
Lord President of the Council
 John MacGregor, Lord President of the Council (1990–1992)
Lord Chancellor
 James Mackay, Baron Mackay of Clashfern, Lord Chancellor (1987–1997)
Secretary of State for Social Security
 Tony Newton, Secretary of State for Social Security (1989–1992)
Chancellor of the Duchy of Lancaster
 Chris Patten, Chancellor of the Duchy of Lancaster (1990–1992)

Religion
 Archbishop of Canterbury
Robert Runcie, Archbishop of Canterbury (1980–1991; retired 31 January)
George Carey, Archbishop of Canterbury (1991–2002; installed 19 April)
 Archbishop of York
 John Stapylton Habgood, Archbishop of York (1983–1995)

1991
Leaders
British incumbents